Otego is a village in Otsego County, New York, United States. The population was 1,010 at the 2010 census.

The Village of Otego is in the southern part of the Town of Otego and is southwest of Oneonta.

History 

There was no significant European settlement in the area until after the American Revolution.

Geography
Otego is located at  (42.391684, -75.17802).

According to the United States Census Bureau, the village has a total area of 1.1 square miles (3.0 km2), all land.

The village is north of Interstate 88 and the Susquehanna River. The village is located on NY Route 7. County Highway 7 (Otsdawa Avenue) enters the village from the north.

Demographics

As of the census of 2000, there were 1,052 people, 386 households, and 265 families residing in the village. The population density was 917.3 people per square mile (353.2/km2). There were 427 housing units at an average density of 372.3 per square mile (143.4/km2). The racial makeup of the village was 96.20% White, 2.09% Black or African American, 0.19% Native American, 0.19% Asian, 0.38% from other races, and 0.95% from two or more races. Hispanic or Latino of any race were 2.00% of the population.

There were 386 households, out of which 35.8% had children under the age of 18 living with them, 55.2% were married couples living together, 10.1% had a female householder with no husband present, and 31.1% were non-families. 25.4% of all households were made up of individuals, and 12.4% had someone living alone who was 65 years of age or older. The average household size was 2.59 and the average family size was 3.09.

In the village, the population was spread out, with 28.9% under the age of 18, 6.3% from 18 to 24, 26.4% from 25 to 44, 24.3% from 45 to 64, and 14.1% who were 65 years of age or older. The median age was 38 years. For every 100 females, there were 86.9 males. For every 100 females age 18 and over, there were 79.8 males.

The median income for a household in the village was $40,000, and the median income for a family was $47,321. Males had a median income of $32,250 versus $26,875 for females. The per capita income for the village was $17,624. About 6.0% of families and 11.6% of the population were below the poverty line, including 8.3% of those under age 18 and 9.8% of those age 65 or over.

References

Villages in New York (state)
Villages in Otsego County, New York